Airports of Regions (/Aeroporty Regionov/) is the largest airport holding and management company in Russia and is owned by CJSC Renova Group. It is based in Moscow, Russia. AR works in the transportation industry and provides services such as airport management and airport facility development. The company currently has full operating rights over Kurumoch International Airport, Koltsovo Airport, and Nizhny Novgorod International Airport ( also known as Strigino). The company also has partial operating rights or/and investments projects in Rostov-On-Don's "Platov" (Russian: Платов) and Saratov's "Gagarinsky" (Russian: Гагаринский) new airport constructions.

The general director of the company as of November 8, 2014, is Evgeniy A. Chudnovskiy.

Operations 

Airports partially owned and/or managed by Airports of Regions:

References

 
Renova Group
Companies based in Moscow